Alveolar glands, also called saccular glands are glands with a saclike secretory portion, in contrast with tubular glands. They typically have an enlarged lumen (cavity), hence the name: they have a shape similar to alveoli, the very small air sacs in the lungs.

Some sources draw a clear distinction between acinar and alveolar glands, based upon the size of the lumen. A further complication in the case of the alveolar glands may occur in the form of still smaller saccular diverticuli growing out from the main sacculi.

The term "racemose gland" is used to describe a "compound alveolar gland" or "compound acinar gland."

Branched alveolar glands are classified as follows:

Additional images

See also
 Acinus

References

Glands